Marjorie Wood (5 September 1882 – 9 November 1955) was a British-born American actress on stage and in film.

Early life
Marjorie Wood was born in Dublin (some sources give her birthplace as London ) on 5 September 1882.

Career
Wood's stage career included parts in Strongheart (1907), Mary Jane's Pa (1908), The Call of the North (1908), The Third Party (1914), Yes or No (1918), Madame Pierre (1922), Yellow (1926), The Good Earth (1933), and Chu Chin Chow (1919-1921), "an Oriental extravaganza". When she played a telephone operator in The Woman (1912), she was invited to visit a large telephone exchange in Chicago, to meet women who did that job in real life.

In films, Wood appeared, usually in small roles, in The Women (1939), Pride and Prejudice (1940), Down in San Diego (1941), Anchors Aweigh (1945), Behind City Lights (1945), Adventure (1945),  Boys' Ranch (1946), Adam's Rib (1949), Annie Get Your Gun (1950), Caged (1950), A Life of Her Own (1950),  The Company She Keeps (1951), and Seven Brides for Seven Brothers (1954).

Marjorie Wood was a director of George M. Cohan's Actors' Fidelity League, which was organized in opposition to Actors' Equity Association.

Personal life
By 1910 she was married to John J. Gleason. Five years later, Wood explained that she enjoyed the acting life because it made marriage optional: "With the ability to earn money and take care of ourselves, we don't have to stay tied to a husband we detest, just because we need someone to support us."

Marjorie Wood died in California in 1955, aged 73 years.

Filmography

References

External links

1882 births
1955 deaths
American actresses
British emigrants to the United States